Bram Som (born 20 February 1980, in Terborg) is a Dutch runner who specializes in the 800 metres. His personal best time of 1:43.45 minutes, achieved in August 2006 in Zürich, is also the current Dutch National Record. He missed the 2005 season, but returned in 2006 to win the national Dutch championship for the fifth time since 2000. Later that year he won the European championship.

Som participated in the 2000 Summer Olympics as well as the 2004 Summer Olympics. In 2000 he was eliminated in the first round as his time of 1:48.58 was not enough to advance. Four years later he would reach the semi finals in which he came fifth with a time of 1:45.52.

He is currently an 800m pacemaker, as of the 2016 Diamond League.

Achievements

Personal Best times

References

External links

http://www.bramsom.nl

1980 births
Living people
Dutch male middle-distance runners
Athletes (track and field) at the 2000 Summer Olympics
Athletes (track and field) at the 2004 Summer Olympics
European Athletics Championships medalists
Olympic athletes of the Netherlands
People from Oude IJsselstreek
Pacemakers
Sportspeople from Gelderland
21st-century Dutch people